Imperial Air Cargo was a cargo airline based in Johannesburg, South Africa that operated domestic overnight express cargo services.

History
The airline started operations on 1 August 2006. It was owned by Imperial Holdings (70%) and Comair (30%). In November 2014 the airline was acquired by BidAir Cargo. The company ceased operations after the merger of both airlines.

Destinations
Imperial Air Cargo operated domestic overnight express cargo services to the following domestic destinations as of 5 May 2011:

 Cape Town
 Bloemfontein
 Durban
 East London
 George
 Johannesburg
 Port Elizabeth

Fleet
In May 2014 the Imperial Air Cargo fleet consisted of the following aircraft:

References

External links
 Imperial Air Cargo
 Titanium Air

Airlines established in 2006
Defunct airlines of South Africa
Cargo airlines
Companies based in Johannesburg
South African companies established in 2006